Porto de Moz Airport  is the airport serving Porto de Moz, Brazil.

Airlines and destinations

Access

See also

List of airports in Brazil

References

External links

Airports in Pará